Akash Lal (born 6 October 1940) is a former Indian first-class cricketer who mainly played for Delhi and Punjab, and a former Indian team selector.

Life and career
Akash Lal was born on 6 October 1940 in Kapurthala, Punjab. His father Muni Lal was also a first-class cricketer who played in the 1930s and 1940s. His uncle Jagdish Lal, father of Indian cricketer Arun Lal, had also played first-class cricket for various teams.

Lal was a right-handed opening batsman who made his first-class debut for Patiala in the 1957/58 season. He switched to Delhi for the 1959/60 season and played ten seasons for them. He captained Delhi for three seasons from 1965/66. He was in contention for getting selected for the Indian team in 1966. He scored 82 and 4 in a tour match against West Indies at Delhi, but due to his struggle against Garry Sobers' spin bowling and a dropped catch, he was not selected. He moved to Punjab before the 1969/70 season and represented them until the 1975/76 season.

After retirement, Lal became a selector for the Indian national cricket team. He was part of the five-member selection panel that picked Sachin Tendulkar in the Indian team at the age of 16 for his first international tour against Pakistan. Lal was one of the three members of the panel who voted in favour of Tendulkar's selection.

References

External links 
 

1940 births
Living people
Indian cricketers
Delhi cricketers
Punjab, India cricketers
Patiala cricketers
North Zone cricketers
India national cricket team selectors
People from Kapurthala